Peyghan (also Romanized as Peyghān and  Pighan; also known as Peygam and Peyghān Chāy) is a village in Peyghan Chayi Rural District of the Central District of Kaleybar County, East Azerbaijan province, Iran. At the 2006 National Census, its population was 785 in 178 households. The following census in 2011 counted 977 people in 239 households. The latest census in 2016 showed a population of 741 people in 248 households; it was the largest village in its rural district.

References 

Kaleybar County

Populated places in East Azerbaijan Province

Populated places in Kaleybar County